All Japan Pro Wrestling TV (AJPW TV) is a subscription-based video streaming service owned by All Japan Pro Wrestling. On February 4, 2018, AJPW announced "All Japan Pro Wrestling TV", a new worldwide streaming site for the promotion's events. All major AJPW events air live on the service, which also features matches from the promotion's archives, dating back to 2017. The service was launched on March 19, 2018 but does not include footage from the 1990s and before, due to Nippon TV owning the rights.

See also

 Club WWN
 Wrestle Universe

References

External links 
 

Internet television channels
All Japan Pro Wrestling
Internet properties established in 2018
2018 establishments in Japan
Subscription video streaming services
Professional wrestling streaming services
Mass media in Yokohama